The Laurent Clerc Award is an annual honor bestowed by Gallaudet University's Alumni Association to recognize a deaf person for "his or her outstanding contributions to society," and specifically to honor their achievements in the interest of deaf people. It is named for Laurent Clerc (1785-1869). It has been given to notable scientists and inventors, such as deaf scientist Robert Weitbrecht, to honor his contributions in developing the teleprinter and an acoustic coupler for the early computer modem. It is awarded by Gallaudet University's Alumni Association through its Laurent Clerc Cultural Fund.

Recipients
2020 Ernest Elmer Hairston
2019 Nancy Rourke
2018 Drago Renteria
2017 Michelle A. Banks
2016 Nyle Lorenzo DiMarco
2015 Stephen C. Baldwin
2014 Alfred Sonnenstrahl
 2013 Ann Silver
 2012 Charles C. Baird
 2011 Allison Schlesinger-Sepulveda, founder of National Center for Deaf Advocacy
 2010 Barbara Kannapell
 2009 Scott DeLoach
 (2008: No award)
 2007 Roy "Ed" Bosson and Nathie L. Marbury
 2006 Gertrude Scott Galloway
 (2005: No award)
 2004 Carol Padden and Tom L. Humphries
 2003 Kevin Nolan, Sr.
 2002 Berta Foster
 2001 Frank Lala
 2000 Ben Soukup
 1999 Sam Rittenberg
 1998 Alexander "Sandy" Ewan
 1997 Marvin J. Marshall
 1996 Ausma Smits
 1995 Earnest I. Okwara
 1994 Albert Couthen
 1993 Gilbert C. Eastman
 1992 John B. Davis
 1991 Otto B. Berg
 1990 Leo M. Jacobs
 1989 Jack R. Gannon
 1988 Ernest Marshall
 1987 Charley E. Whisman
 1986 William J. Marra and Willard Shorter
 1985 William T. Griffing and Florence B. Crammatte
 1984 Jess M. Smith
 1983 Gordon L. Allen
 1982 Alan B. Crammatte
 1981 Byron B. Burnes
 1980 Frederick C. Schreiber
 1979 Frank B. Sullivan
 (1977 & 1978: No award)
 1976 Robert G. Sanderson
 1975 Frank R. Turk
 1974 Benjamin M. Schowe, Sr.
 1973 James N. Orman
 (1972: No award)
 1971 Robert H. Weitbrecht
 1970 David Peikoff

References

External links
 Laurent Clerc Award at Gallaudet University

American awards
Deaf culture
Gallaudet University